Dina Koritskaya (born 22 February 1975) is a Russian heptathlete. Her personal best result is 6401 points, achieved in July 2000 in Tula.

International competitions

References 

1975 births
Living people
Russian heptathletes
Olympic heptathletes
Olympic athletes of Russia
Athletes (track and field) at the 2000 Summer Olympics
Russian Athletics Championships winners